Hajer Bahouri (born 30 March 1958, in Tunis) is a Franco-Tunisian mathematician who is interested in partial differential equations. She is Director of Research at the National Center for Scientific Research and the Laboratory of Analysis and Applied Mathematics at the University Paris-Est-Créteil-Val-de-Marne.

Career

From 1977, Bahouri studied mathematics at the University of Tunis, graduating in 1979; she then received the President's Award. She studied in Paris and obtained a Master of Advanced Studies in 1980 at the University Paris-Sud and a doctorate in 1982, under the direction of Serge Alinhac, with a thesis entitled Uniqueness and non-uniqueness of the Cauchy problem for real symbol operators. Then she devoted herself to research at École Polytechnique; from 1984 to 1988, she was a lecturer at the University of Paris-Sud and Rennes-I. In 1987, she obtained her doctoral degree (thesis) at the University of Paris-Sud (Uniqueness, non-uniqueness and Hölder continuity of the Cauchy problem for partial differential equations. Propagation of the wavefront Cρ for nonlinear equations).

Starting in 1988 she was a professor at the Tunis University, where she directed, from 2003, the laboratory of partial differential equations. From 2002 to 2004, she was also a lecturer at École Polytechnique. Since 2010, she has been Research Director of the National Center for Scientific Research at the University Paris-Est-Créteil-Val-de-Marne (Laboratory of Analysis and Applied Mathematics).

Awards

In 2002, she was a guest speaker at the International Congress of Mathematicians in Beijing, with Jean-Yves Chemin (Quasilinear wave equations and microlocal analysis). In 2001, she received the Tunisian Medal of Merit and, in 2016, she won the Paul Doistau-Émile Blutet Prize.

Selected publications

" High Frequency Approximation of Solutions to Critical Nonlinear Wave Equations", 1997
  
 "Phase-space Analysis and Pseudodifferential Calculus on the Heisenberg Group", 2012

References

Living people
1958 births
21st-century French mathematicians
20th-century French mathematicians
20th-century French women scientists
21st-century French women scientists
20th-century women mathematicians
21st-century women mathematicians
Academic staff of École Polytechnique
French women mathematicians
Knights of the Ordre national du Mérite
Paris-Sud University alumni
Academic staff of Paris-Sud University
Prix Paul Doistau–Émile Blutet laureates
Tunis University alumni
Academic staff of Tunis University
Tunisian women scientists
Tunisian mathematicians